Belcher  is one of the 15 constituencies in the Central and Western District of Hong Kong.

The constituency returns one district councillor to the Central and Western District Council, with an election every four years.

Belcher constituency is loosely based on the area around The Belcher's in Shek Tong Tsui with estimated population of 20,077.

Councillors represented

Election results

2010s

2000s

1990s

Citations

References
2011 District Council Election Results (Central & Western)
2007 District Council Election Results (Central & Western)
2003 District Council Election Results (Central & Western)
1999 District Council Election Results (Central & Western)

1999 in Hong Kong
2003 in Hong Kong
2007 in Hong Kong
Constituencies of Hong Kong
Central and Western District, Hong Kong
Constituencies of Central and Western District Council
Shek Tong Tsui
Constituencies established in 1994
1994 establishments in Hong Kong